Craig Parker (born 12 November 1970) is a New Zealand actor, known for his roles as Guy Warner in the New Zealand soap opera Shortland Street (1992–96, 2007–08, 2020), Haldir in the Lord of the Rings films The Fellowship of the Ring (2001) and The Two Towers (2002), Darken Rahl in the syndicated television series Legend of the Seeker (2008–10), Gaius Claudius Glaber in the starz series Spartacus (2010–12), and Stéphane Narcisse in the CW television series Reign (2014–17).

Career
Parker starred in the TVNZ soap opera Shortland Street as Guy Warner, a character that has made several return appearances, most recently involving a story where Guy ran off with his brother's wife, Toni, only to return months later as a drug addled loser who attempted to use his daughter to score drugs for him. It ultimately led to the death storyline of Toni Warner. He is the reigning champion of New Zealand's Celebrity Joker Poker. He made his soap debut in 1992, and last appeared in 2020.

Parker appeared as Haldir of Lórien in The Lord of the Rings film trilogy from 2001 to 2003, and as Sabas in Underworld: Rise of the Lycans (2009). He starred in a number of New Zealand television series, most notable Mercy Peak (2001-2004), and Diplomatic Immunity (2009). He guest-starred on Xena: Warrior Princess, Young Hercules, Sleepy Hollow, and NCIS. He also serves as narrator for New Zealand documentaries.

Parker starred as Darken Rahl in Sam Raimi and Rob Tapert's syndicated television series Legend of the Seeker. He later starred as Gaius Claudius Glaber in the Starz original series Spartacus: Blood and Sand, and Spartacus: Vengeance which premiered on 22 January 2010 and is also produced by Raimi and Tapert.

From 2014 to 2017, Parker played Lord Stéphane Narcisse in the CW period romance drama series Reign. He guest starred in Agents of S.H.I.E.L.D. portraying the Kree Taryan in 2018, and later had a recurring role during the first season of the 2018 reboot of Charmed playing Alastair Caine.

Personal life
His grandfather moved from Edinburgh, Scotland, to Fiji when he was stationed during his years of service in the British Army. Apart from his Scottish ancestry, Parker is also of Welsh, Danish, and English descent. Parker was educated at Glenfield College, on Auckland's North Shore.

Parker is openly gay. He came out in an interview with The New Zealand Herald in 2008.

Filmography

Film

Television

Theatre

References

External links

 

1970 births
20th-century LGBT people
20th-century New Zealand male actors
21st-century New Zealand male actors
Living people
New Zealand male film actors
New Zealand male stage actors
New Zealand male soap opera actors
New Zealand male television actors
New Zealand people of Danish descent
New Zealand people of English descent
New Zealand people of Scottish descent
New Zealand people of Welsh descent
People from Suva
Fijian people of English descent
Fijian people of Scottish descent
Fijian people of Welsh descent
Fijian people of Danish descent
Fijian people of Cornish descent
New Zealand people of Cornish descent
Fijian emigrants to New Zealand
People educated at Glenfield College
New Zealand gay actors